Dytiscus dauricus is a species of predaceous diving beetle in the family Dytiscidae. It is found in North America and the Palearctic.

Subspecies
These two subspecies belong to the species Dytiscus dauricus:
 Dytiscus dauricus dauricus Gebler, 1832
 Dytiscus dauricus zaitzevi Nakane, 1990

References

Further reading

 

Dytiscidae
Articles created by Qbugbot
Beetles described in 1832